Gold Coast Highway links the coastal suburbs of the Gold Coast in south eastern Queensland such as Miami, Mermaid Beach, Tugun, Bilinga to the Tweed Heads suburb of Tweed Heads West in New South Wales. At  in length, the highway runs just west of Pacific Motorway at Pacific Pines to Pacific Motorway at Tweed Heads West. It passes through the numerous popular tourist areas including Surfers Paradise and Broadbeach, a commercial centre at Southport, residential areas, shopping centres and the Gold Coast (Coolangatta) Airport.

It is characterised by a variety of urban landscapes, ranging from:
 high-density high rises between Southport and Broadbeach
 low rise apartments in Palm Beach and Bilinga 
 low-rise residential areas at Miami, Tugun and Labrador 
 shopping at Southport and Broadbeach
 entertainment precincts at Broadbeach and Surfers Paradise
 historic motels at Mermaid Beach
 light industry at Arundel
 native bushland at Coombabah Lake wetlands, Burleigh Head National Park and Currumbin Hill
 parklands, sport and recreation at the Southport Broadwater Parklands and many smaller reserves
 coastal views at Currumbin Creek

The highest point of the highway is 42 metres at Currumbin Hill.

History

Gold Coast Highway has existed since at least 1966, based on a page from a 1966 street directory. 

The section between Currumbin in Queensland and Tweed Heads in New South Wales was formerly part of Pacific Highway. The first stage of the Tweed Heads bypass, a two-lane road connecting Pacific Highway (today Coolangatta Road) at Bilinga across the border to Kennedy Drive at Tweed Heads West, was opened in 1985 at a total cost of $3.6mil, with the second carriageway completed in December 1986; the second stage, bypassing Tweed Heads South connecting Kennedy Drive over Terrenora Creek to Pacific Highway (today Minjungbal Drive, renamed 19 February 1997) was completed on 15 November 1992, at a total cost of $46mi, and Pacific Highway redefined to use this new alignment.

The Tugun Bypass, connecting Pacific Motorway at Tugun Hill in Queensland to Pacific Highway about 1 kilometre north of the interchange with Kennedy Drive at Tweed Heads West in New South Wales, opened in June 2008, extending the motorway around (and under) the Gold Coast Airport. The former alignment of Pacific Highway within Queensland was quickly re-declared as part of Gold Coast Highway; the New South Wales government eventually followed a year later.

The passing of the Roads Act of 1993 through the Parliament of New South Wales updated road classifications and the way they could be declared within New South Wales. Under this act, Gold Coast Highway was declared as Highway 31 on 1 May 2009, from the state border with Queensland to the interchange with Pacific Motorway at Tweed Heads West (subsuming the former alignment of Highway 10, Pacific Highway, which was re-declared to use the Tugun bypass). The highway today, as Highway 31, still retains this declaration.

Road conditions

The highway is divided along the entire length, mostly with four lanes. There are some six lane segments (often as bus lanes). It is also predominantly well lit at night, with a few exceptions such as Currumbin and Burleigh Heads. Median fencing to prevent pedestrians crossing has also been introduced in areas such as Mermaid Beach. The highway at Surfers Paradise is subject to congestion during events, notably during the Gold Coast 600 held each October when part of the highway becomes part of the Surfers Paradise Street Circuit at Paradise Waters. The highway width is reduced to two lanes (one carriageway) and the speed limit reduced to 40 km/h.

Projects and improvements
1. Labrador: Between Government Road and North Street, along a section mostly called Frank Street. The Highway was upgraded from a single carriageway to a divided 4 lane highway. A new bridge with a 4 lane crossing was completed across Loders Creek in 2007. The road upgrade resulted in a thoroughfare similar to that in Surfers Paradise, with a narrow median and narrow road reserve due to limited space and to minimise property resumptions. One of the two lanes in each direction was initially designated a transit lane (buses and vehicles with 2 or more occupants), but this designation was removed in 2013.

2. Broadbeach to Miami: Bus lanes were added along the route as well as changes to bus stops, u-turns, traffic lights, signs, lighting and the median strip. The first phase (Alexandra Avenue to Hilda Street) was finished in mid September 2008. The second phase (Hilda Street to Chairlift Avenue) was largely completed in July 2009.

3. Some minor changes and improvements near Stewart Road in Tugun have coincided with the completion of the bypass to deal with the changed traffic flow.

Upgrade projects

Hope Island Road intersection
A project to upgrade the Hope Island Road intersection, at a cost of $10.68 million, was completed in mid-2021.

Toolona Street intersection
A project to upgrade the Toolona Street intersection in Tugun, at a cost of $1.5 million, started in September 2021.

Public transport

Bus
Bus services throughout the area are operated by Surfside Buslines. Route 700 operates along the highway between Broadbeach South and Tweed Heads. On Sunday to Thursday nights it continues north of Broadbeach South to the Gold Coast University Hospital. It is the only 24-hour bus route in Australia. It is complemented by limited stops route 777 from Broadbeach South to Gold Coast Airport.

Bus Lanes are in place along some sections of the highway, particularly Broadbeach to Mermaid Beach and Miami.

Light Rail
The G:link light rail line opened in July 2014 between Gold Coast University Hospital and Broadbeach South. It has its own reservation to the west of the Gold Coast Highway from Southport to Surfers Paradise, from where it diverges onto Surfers Paradise Boulevard. It then rejoins the Gold Coast Highway at the south end of Surfers Paradise proceeding via a reservation in the median strip to Broadbeach North before crossing again to the western side to terminate at Broadbeach South. The northern extension to  Helensvale opened in December 2017.

Railway
Helensvale railway station is located near the northern end of the highway. It is on the Gold Coast railway line with services operating frequently along the electrified line between Brisbane and Varsity Lakes.

Air
Gold Coast Airport is located at the southern end of the highway. It has frequent flights to Sydney and Melbourne as well as international services to New Zealand, Japan and South-East Asia.

Major intersections

Trivia
 Musician David Grohl was famously arrested in a northern Surfers Paradise section of the Gold Coast Highway after electing to drunkenly ride back to his band's Marriott hotel on a rented moped scooter following the Foo Fighters' performance at the Big Day Out in January 2000. Grohl reportedly blew an alcohol level of 0.095 at a sobriety checkpoint on the Gold Coast Highway and was subsequently jailed for one night.

See also 

 Highways in Australia
 List of highways in Queensland

References

External links 

 South Coast Region traffic cameras

Highways in Queensland
Roads on the Gold Coast, Queensland